The 2017 Soeratin Cup (also known as the Pertamina Soeratin Cup for sponsorship reasons) season is a football competition which is intended for footballers under the age of seventeen and fifteen. The national round started on 14 October 2017.

Persab Brebes are the defending champion for U-17. PKN Penajam Utama won the title of U-17 on 28 October 2017 after defeating Persita Tangerang 3–2 at the final. Askot Bandung won the title of U-15 on 28 October 2017 after defeating PSSA Asahan 4–1 at the final.

Format
Each Provincial Association only given one representative to the national round. 30 teams will perform in the national round of under-15 and 32 teams in under-17, consist of teams of provincial competition winners. National round took place in Magelang, Central Java and Special Region of Yogyakarta.

Teams

U-17

U-15

National Round
National round took place in Magelang, Central Java and Special Region of Yogyakarta. Two teams from each group will advance to the knockout round.

U-17

Group stage
32 teams from each provincial association will compete. Matches for the Group Stage will be played from 14 October 2017. All group will play half season round-robin.

Group A
This group will be held in Sultan Agung Stadium, Bantul.

|}

Group B
This group will be held in Sultan Agung Stadium, Bantul.

|}

Group C
This group will be held in Maguwoharjo Stadium, Sleman.

|}

Group D
This group will be held in Maguwoharjo Stadium, Sleman.

|}

Group E
This group will be held in Moch. Soebroto Stadium, Magelang.

|}

Group F
This group will be held in Moch. Soebroto Stadium, Magelang.

|}

Group G
This group will be held in Gemilang Stadium, Magelang Regency.

|}

Group H
This group will be held in Gemilang Stadium, Magelang Regency.

|}

Knockout stage

Round of 16

|}

Quarter-finals

|}

Semi-finals

|}

Third-place
As Persiter Ternate disqualified from the tournament, PSS Sleman won third-place position automatically.

Final

|}

U-15

Group stage
30 teams from each provincial association will compete. Matches for the Group Stage will be played from 15 October 2017. All group will play half season round-robin.

Group A
This group will be held in Dwi Windu Stadium, Bantul.

|}

Group B
This group will be held in Dwi Windu Stadium, Bantul.

|}

Group C
This group will be held in Abu Bakrin Stadium, Magelang.

|}

Group D
This group will be held in Abu Bakrin Stadium, Magelang.

|}

Group E
This group will be held in Tridadi Stadium, Sleman.

|}

Group F
This group will be held in Tridadi Stadium, Sleman.

|}

Group G
This group will be held in Yogyakarta State University Stadium, Yogyakarta.

|}

Group H
This group will be held in Yogyakarta State University Stadium, Yogyakarta.

|}

Knockout stage

Round of 16

|}

Quarter-finals

|}

Semi-finals

|}

Third-place

|}

Final

|}

See also

 2017 Liga 1
 2017 Liga 2
 2017 Liga 3
 2017 Indonesia President's Cup
 2017 Liga 1 U-19

References

Soeratin Cup
2017 in Indonesian football leagues
2017 in Indonesian sport